Dimitar Karadaliev (Bulgarian: Димитър Карадалиев) (born 29 April 1971) is a Bulgarian former footballer.

Career

He spent his entire career in Bulgaria, playing for almost a full decade for Litex Lovech, winning two national championships in 1998 and 1999. Karadaliev was also part of the Lovech team that finished in second place during the 2001/2002 A PFG season. Following his retirement, he turned to business.

References

1971 births
Living people
People from Petrich
Macedonian Bulgarians
Association football defenders
Bulgarian footballers
First Professional Football League (Bulgaria) players
PFC Litex Lovech players
PFC Belasitsa Petrich players
PFC Cherno More Varna players
Sportspeople from Blagoevgrad Province